AFFCU (trade name Air Force Federal Credit Union) is a US credit union headquartered in San Antonio, Texas, chartered and regulated under the authority of the National Credit Union Administration (NCUA) in 1952. AFFCU's routing number for 314085504.

History 

AFFCU—formerly known as Lackland Federal Credit Union—was founded in November 1952 by 10 airmen volunteers, who donated $5 each. In 1953, it was operating from a one-room office on Lackland Air Force Base.
On March 15, 2002, Lackland FCU changed its name to AFFCU. The name change helped the credit union to better identify with its membership as well as create a vision for the future.

In 2006, AFFCU joined the CO-OP Financial Services giving members access to over 30,000 ATMs worldwide surcharge-free. In the summer of the following year, AFFCU joined the Shared Branching Network. This partnership gave members access to more than 5,400 branches and kiosks located in 46 states and in Germany, Italy, Japan, South Korea and Puerto Rico.

2012 was another year of growth and change for AFFCU. On June 29, 2012, AFFCU added The Airman Heritage Foundation as a Select Employee Group (SEG). This SEG changed AFFCU from a single common bond credit union to a multiple common bond credit union and granted membership eligibility to members of the Airman Heritage Foundation.

In May 2018, AFFCU merged with Local 142 Federal Credit Union, a single-office credit union that served members of several local unions. This was followed by an announcement that the corporate name was being changed to "AFFCU" to reflect that the field of membership had expanded to groups outside the military community. The corporate logo was replaced with a stylized "A". 

In 2019, the entity opened its first Financial Center outside the state of Texas.  This was in Columbus, Mississippi.

As of June 2022, the credit union had more an $590 million in assets, and over 51,000 members worldwide.

Services 

AFFCU offers many products and services in common with other financial institutions, including online and mobile banking, savings accounts, checking accounts, and certificates.

AFFCU also offers consumer loans including, personal loans, auto loans, student loans, credit cards, and mortgages.

The Investment Center at AFFCU offers more extensive investment services and related supports, financial planning, and insurance.

AFFCU members have access to 7 AFFCU Financial Centers, over 200 CO-OP Shared Branches throughout Texas, more than 5,400 branches nationwide and over 30,000 surcharge-free CO-OP Network ATMs worldwide.

Community Involvement
Scholarships: Each year, AFFCU awards five $5,000 scholarships to outstanding high school seniors.

Donations: AFFCU has proudly collaborated with organizations within local communities such as The San Antonio Food Bank, Fisher House, Alamo Breast Cancer Foundation, Pink Berets, Wounded Warriors Honor Flight San Antonio, and The Children's Hospital of San Antonio.

Awards and recognition

 2013 – No. 1 Military Financial Institution
 2013 – Credit Union of the Year by the United States Air Force
 2014 – No. 2 Military Financial Institution
 2014 – 9 Best Auto Loan Rates in San Antonio
 2015 – No. 10 Military Financial Institution
 2016 – Received America Saves Designation of Savings Excellence for Credit Unions
 2016 – Top best Credit Unions in San Antonio
 2017 – 15 Best Credit Union Credit Cards
 2018 – Credit Union of the Year by the United States Air Force
 2020 – Best Military Banks and Credit Unions 
 2020 – Received Military Saves Designation of Savings Excellence for Credit Unions
 2020 – Credit Union of the Year by the United States Air Force

References

External links 
 Official website
 Board of Directors
 Locations & ATMs
 National Credit Union Administration

Credit unions based in Texas
Companies based in San Antonio
Mutual companies of the United States
Banks established in 1952
1952 establishments in Texas
Military in San Antonio